The 2011 LEB Oro promotion Playoffs was the final phase of the 2010–2011 LEB Oro season. It will start on April 29, 2011, and it finished on June 1, 3 or 5 if necessary.

All the series were best-of-5 games. The winner of the playoffs was Blu:sens Monbús and promoted to 2011–12 ACB season with CB Murcia, the champion of the regular season.

Quarterfinals
Quarterfinals were to be played on April 29, May 1, May 4 and if necessary May 6 and 8.

Blu:sens Monbús - Cáceres Creativa

Ford Burgos - Grupo Iruña Navarra

Girona FC - Isla de Tenerife Canarias

Baloncesto León - Leche Río Breogán

Semifinals
Semifinals will be played on May 13, 15, 18 and if necessary 20 and 22.

Blu:sens Monbús – Leche Río Breogán

Ford Burgos – Girona FC

Finals
The Playoffs Finals will be played on May 27, 29, June 1 and if necessary 3 and 5.

References

External links
Spanish basketball federation website

LEB Oro playoffs
playoff